In architecture, a Nubian vault is a type of curved surface forming a vaulted structure. The mudbrick structure was revived by Egyptian architect Hassan Fathy after re-discovering the technique in the Nubian village of Abu al-Riche. The technology is advocated by environmentalists as environmentally friendly and sustainable since it makes use of pure earth without the need of timber. The technology is of Nubian origin.

One of the key advantages of the Nubian vault is that it can be built without any support or shuttering. The earth bricks are laid leaning at a slight slope against the gable walls in a length-wise vault, as in this photo of a building from the ruins of Ayn Asil in Egypt. The same principle can be used to build domes, as in the example below from Cameroon.

The age-old Nubian vault technique was notably revived by the Egyptian architect Hassan Fathy in the 1940s with the building of a new village at Gourna, near Luxor. Architecturally, this village is a singular success; however, the families who were moved there soon abandoned it to return to their original village.

More recently, since the year 2000, a French /Burkinabé NGO La Voûte Nubienne, by simplifying and codifying the VN (Voûte Nubienne) technique, has promoted the construction of over 1600 vaulted buildings in Burkina Faso, Mali, and Senegal (mainly village homes, but also a Catholic church, several mosques, schools, literacy centres, and a dispensary). These environmentally sound, comfortable, and aesthetic buildings require neither imported sheet metal for the roofing, nor expensive and increasingly rare timber beams. Over 260 masons have been trained in the technique, and there are as many apprentices currently undergoing on-the-job training on building sites (2012). The programme organised by the Association "Earth roofs for the Sahel" is experiencing around 30% year on year growth in response to demand from rural families, with many requests for help and technical advice coming from the countries of the Sahel, and from further afield (a programme was launched in Zambia in early 2009, under the aegis of AVN-Belgium).

See also
Nubian architecture
List of architectural vaults
Catenary arch
Inverted catenary arch
Taq Kasra

Literature
Architecture for the Poor by Hasan Fathy - online pdf:  http://www.arvindguptatoys.com/arvindgupta/fathy.pdf
Google Books: Building with Earth

References
This article is based on a translation of the corresponding article from the French Wikipedia, retrieved on July 31, 2006.

Arches and vaults
History of Nubia
Architecture in Egypt